Rocky Creek is a stream in Victoria County, Texas, in the United States.

Rocky Creek was named from the rocky character of its creek bed.

See also
List of rivers of Texas

References

Rivers of Victoria County, Texas
Rivers of Texas